Beaverbrook is a suburban neighbourhood in Kanata North Ward in the city of Ottawa, Ontario, Canada. It is located within the former city of Kanata. Beaverbrook is known for its hedged houses and community facilities. The neighbourhood is bounded by the Kanata North Business Park to the north, March Road to the east, Campeau Drive to the south and Knudson Avenue & Weslock Way to the west.

According to the Canada 2011 Census, the total population of the neighbourhood was 5,182.

History 
Originally known as Kanata, Beaverbook is the first and oldest residential neighbourhood in Kanata. The area was an agricultural part of March Township until the 1960s when developer and planner Bill Teron set about creating a planned Garden City community. The first street to be developed was Tiffany Crescent in 1964. John Mlacak, who was the reeve of March Township from 1968 to 1976, helped lead the development of Kanata during the 1970s, 1980s and onward. The city centre didn't grow as he had originally planned, but eventually with its residences, hi-tech businesses, and commercial services, in 1978 it was incorporated as the new City of Kanata, which was named after the neighbourhood after a referendum.  Beaverbrook is named after Max Aitken, Lord Beaverbrook.

Schools 
 Earl of March Secondary School
 Stephen Leacock Public School
 W. Erskine Johnston Public School
 Roland Michener Public School
 Georges Vanier Catholic School

Notable natives and residents 
 Terry Matthews KBE FIEE FREng (hc) (born 1943) – entrepreneur, chairman of Mitel
 Trevor Matthews - Founder & CEO, Brookstreet Pictures
 Marianne Wilkinson - Past Mayor and City Councillor of Kanata North

External links 
Kanata Beaverbrook Community Association

References

Neighbourhoods in Ottawa